is a Japanese Olympic dressage rider. Representing Japan, she competed at two Summer Olympics (in 2008 and 2016). Her best Olympic results came in 2008 when she placed 9th in the team and 45th in the individual dressage events.

She also competed at the 2010 World Equestrian Games, where she achieved 13th and 54th positions in team and individual competitions, respectively.

References

External links
 

Living people
1973 births
Sportspeople from Yokohama
Japanese female equestrians
Japanese dressage riders
Equestrians at the 2008 Summer Olympics
Equestrians at the 2016 Summer Olympics
Olympic equestrians of Japan